Keith Alan Marshall (born July 2, 1951) is a former Major League Baseball outfielder. He played in the minor leagues from  until , all in the Royals' organization except his final year, when he played for the Cincinnati Reds' top farm club, the Indianapolis Indians.

Sources

 Baseball Almanac

Major League Baseball outfielders
Kansas City Royals players
Kingsport Royals players
Elmira Pioneers players
Elmira Royals players
Omaha Royals players
Indianapolis Indians players
Baseball players from California
1951 births
Living people
Arizona Instructional League Royals players